The George Cross was awarded to the island of Malta by King George VI during the great siege it underwent by Italy and Germany, in the early part of World War II. In a letter to the island's Governor, Lieutenant-General Sir William Dobbie, King George wrote, "so as to bear witness to the heroism and devotion of its people". The island was a British colony from 1813 to 1964. The George Cross was incorporated into the flag of Malta beginning in 1943 and remains on the current design of the flag.

Historical background

Italian and German bombers attacked the Maltese islands and there was a lack of supplies. An invasion threat in July 1941 failed when coast defenders spotted torpedo boats of the Italian Decima MAS special forces. Whilst people suffered hunger, a final assault to neutralise the island was ordered by the German Field Marshal Albert Kesselring. This assault failed. On 15 April 1942 King George VI awarded the George Cross to the people of Malta in appreciation of their heroism.

The George Cross was awarded during the worst period for the Allies during the Second World War, as the Axis-force had the upper hand. German planes struck the island around the clock, in an attempt to neutralise British bases in Malta, given these were constantly foiling their naval attempts to supply Rommel's North African campaign. Malta's geographic position, between Italy and North Africa, as well as dividing the Mediterranean basin into east and west put the islands in considerable danger. Malta-based British aircraft could reach as far as Tripoli in Libya to the south, Tunisia to the west and German bases in Italy to the north; on Pantelleria, Sicily and even as far as the port of Naples farther to the north.

At the time of the George Cross award, military resources and food rations in Malta were practically depleted. Fuel was restricted to military action and heavily rationed, the population was on the brink of starvation, and even ammunition was running out, so much that Anti-Aircraft (AA) guns could only fire a few rounds per day.

Italian battleships of the Regia Marina out-gunned the British, yet the Royal Navy was not out-classed. The German airforce had superior aircraft until Spitfires were finally sent to Malta. Also at this time, German and Italian strategists were planning Operation Herkules, a sea and air invasion of the Maltese Islands, an effort continuously postponed – until it was too late, because the Maltese Islands finally received their vital supply of fuel, food and munitions.

On 15 August 1942 (feast of Santa Maria) a convoy of Royal and Merchant Navy ships finally made port in Convoy of Santa Maria at Valletta's Grand Harbour, after completing what was considered one of the most heroic maritime episodes in recent history.

The George Cross Award

The George Cross was instituted by King George VI, on 24 September 1940, replacing the Empire Gallantry Medal. It is the civilian equivalent to the Victoria Cross. While intended mainly for civilians, it is awarded also to certain fighting services, confined however to actions for which purely military honours are not normally given. This medal is awarded only for acts of the greatest heroism or the most conspicuous courage in circumstances of extreme danger.

Awarded to Malta

One of only three collective awards of the George Cross was the award to Malta. This award was made by King George VI by a handwritten letter:

The Governor

Malta

To honour her brave people I award the George Cross to the Island Fortress of Malta to bear witness to a heroism and devotion that will long be famous in history.

George R.I.

April 15th 1942Image of handwritten letter  World War II today

Lieutenant-General Sir William Dobbie answered:
By God's help Malta will not weaken but will endure until victory is won.

A public award ceremony in Valletta was held on 13 September 1942, after the arrival of the Santa Maria Convoy.

Today

The Cross and the King's message are today found in the National War Museum in Fort Saint Elmo, Valletta.

Harrods department store flew the Maltese flag to mark Malta's 70th anniversary as a George Cross Island from the 1 to 28 March 2012.

References

20th century in Malta
1942 in Malta
Malta–United Kingdom relations
Crown Colony of Malta
British Empire in World War II
Malta